Holditch may refer to:

 Holditch, a hamlet in Thorncombe, Dorset (formerly Devon), England
Holditch (ward), in the Borough of Newcastle-under-Lyme, England
Hamnet Holditch (1800-1867), English mathematician
Philip Holditch (died ), English merchant and politician, MP for Totnes in 1601

See also
 Holditch Colliery disaster, of 1937 in Staffordshire, England
Holditch's theorem in plane geometry, named after Hamnet Holditch